= PLPA =

PLPA may refer to:

- Professional Lacrosse Players' Association, for U.S. and Canada
- Palmyra (Cooper) Airport (ICAO: PLPA), Palmyra Atoll in the Pacific Ocean
